LNNK is the acronym used to refer to the following organisations:

Latvian National Independence Movement (Latvijas Nacionālās Neatkarības Kustība)
For Fatherland and Freedom/LNNK (Tēvzemei un Brīvībai/LNNK)